Wadi Tahuna is an archaeological site of the Tahunian culture that was excavated in 1928 by Denis Buzy, several kilometers south to Bethlehem in Palestine.

References

Archaeological sites in the West Bank
Archaeological type sites
Tahunian sites
Heavy Neolithic sites
Neolithic settlements